The following list contains saints from Anglo-Saxon England during the period of Christianization until  the Norman Conquest of England (c. AD 600 to 1066). 
It also includes British saints of the Roman and  post-Roman period (3rd to 6th centuries), and other post-biblical saints who, while not themselves English, were strongly associated with particular religious houses in Anglo-Saxon England, for example, their relics reputedly resting with such houses.

The only list of saints which has survived from the Anglo-Saxon period itself is the so-called Secgan, an 11th-century compilation enumerating 89 saints and their resting-places.

Table

 Anglo-Norse, of mixed English and Scandinavian extraction characteristic of northern and central England in the later Anglo-Saxon era
 British, from the British population native to pre-Germanic England, including Welsh, Cornish, Cumbrian and Celtic Armoricans, as well as saints from regions of England Anglicized very late
 East Anglian, ethnically English and either from or strong associated with the East Anglian region of early medieval England, modern Norfolk, Suffolk as well as some of Cambridgeshire or Lincolnshire
 East Saxon, ethnically English and either from or strong associated with the East Saxon region of early medieval England
 Frankish, from the Frankish kingdom in Gaul, including native Latin-speakers but excluding Bretons
 Frisian, from the Frisian region of early medieval Europe
 Gaelic, in origin a Gaelic-speaking Celt from Ireland or northern Britain
 Kentish, ethnically English and either from or strong associated with the Kentish region of early medieval England
 Mercian, ethnically English and either from or strong associated with the Mercian region of early medieval England
 Northumbrian, ethnically English and either from or strong associated with the Northumbrian region of early medieval England
 Roman, from the Roman (or 'Byzantine') Empire, excluding Britain
 Romano-British, from Roman Britain and neither clearly British or clearly Latin
 South Saxon, ethnically English and either from or strongly associated with the South Saxon region of early medieval England
 West Saxon, ethnically English and either from or strongly associated with the West Saxon region of early medieval England

See also
 Secgan
 List of saints of Ireland
 List of Cornish saints
 List of Welsh saints
 List of saints of the Canary Islands

Notes

References

 
 
 
F. Liebermann, Die Heiligen Englands, Hanover, 1889.
 
Susan J. Ridyard, The Royal Saints of Anglo-Saxon England: A Study of West Saxon and East Anglican Cults, Cambridge Studies in Medieval Life and Thought: Fourth Series, 1988.
D. W. Rollason, "Lists of saints' resting-places in Anglo-Saxon England" in ASE 7 (1978), 61-93.
 
 
 
 

Anglo-Saxon
Christian saints of the Middle Ages
Catholic Church in the United Kingdom